Babaganjeh (also Romanized as Bābāganjeh) is a village in Nazlu-e Shomali Rural District, Nazlu District, Urmia County, West Azerbaijan Province, Iran. At the 2006 census, its population was 28, in 9 families.

References 

Populated places in Urmia County